Donatella Albano (born 21 January 1958) is an Italian politician from the Democratic Party of Italy. As of 2014 she serves as Senator of the Parliament of Italy representing Liguria.

References

1958 births
Living people
People from Bordighera
Senators of Legislature XVII of Italy
Democratic Party (Italy) politicians
21st-century Italian politicians
21st-century Italian women politicians
Women members of the Senate of the Republic (Italy)